Odis Oliver Flores (born June 18, 1987), better known by his stage name O.T. Genasis, is an American rapper, actor and singer.

Early life 
Odis Oliver Flores was born on June 18, 1987, in Atlanta to Garifunas from Belize. He is a Garifuna American. He grew up in Long Beach, California. Genasis states that his influences include Cutty Ranks, Buju Banton, T.I., Ludacris, Tupac Shakur, Shabba Ranks, and 50 Cent.

Career 
In 2011, G-Unit Records signed him to their label. In 2012, under his association with G-Unit, he released his untitled debut official mixtape. While doing a number of small local shows in Los Angeles Ca. With his dj, DJ Necterr at the time. He caught the attention of Busta Rhymes. He later was signed to Busta Rhymes' Conglomerate Records. After being signed to Conglomerate Records label, he has been putting out some songs and singles such as "Touchdown (Remix)" featuring Busta Rhymes and French Montana and "CoCo". The latter had success on the charts, peaking at number 20 on the US Billboard Hot 100. Beyoncé used his song "Everybody Mad" as part of her Coachella 2018 performance and as part of her and Jay-Z's On the Run II Tour.

In 2022, "I Look Good" was featured prominently in the "Doin' Laps" commercial for the iPhone 13.

Personal life 
Flores is a father to son Genasis Flores, who was born on March 25, 2010. In a 2016 interview with The Shade Room, O.T. stated his son has autism. On March 14, 2020,  Malika Haqq, an actress and TV personality, delivered their baby boy Ace Flores.

Discography

Mixtapes

Singles

As lead artist

Guest appearances

Notes

References

External links 
 

American rappers
1987 births
Living people
African-American male rappers
American people of Belizean descent
Garifuna people
Gangsta rappers
People from Long Beach, California
Rappers from Los Angeles
Crips
Musicians from Long Beach, California
West Coast hip hop musicians
21st-century American rappers
21st-century American male musicians
Atlantic Records artists
21st-century African-American musicians
20th-century African-American people